Florian Maier (born 7 January 1992) is an Austrian footballer who plays for WSC Hertha Wels.

External links
 
 

Austrian footballers
FC Blau-Weiß Linz players
SV Grödig players
ATSV Stadl-Paura players
2. Liga (Austria) players
Austrian Regionalliga players
1992 births
Living people
Association football defenders